The Ambassador of India to China is the chief diplomatic representative of the Republic of India to the People's Republic of China.

Ambassadors

See also
 Embassy of India, Beijing

References

External links
Embassy of India in Beijing

 
China
India